This is a list of OECD regions by GDP (PPP) per capita, a ranking of subnational entities from members of the Organisation for Economic Co-operation and Development (OECD) by gross domestic product at purchasing power parity prices per capita.

The 381 areas shown below are "territorial level 2" (TL2) regions.

Data are in current 2016 international dollars.

See also
List of OECD countries by GDP per capita
List of countries by GDP (PPP) per capita
List of countries by GDP (nominal) per capita

References

OECD regions
GDP